Marshall School is an independent, coeducational, day school in Duluth, Minnesota for students in kindergarten through 12th grade. Marshall School is sometimes referred to as Duluth Marshall at Minnesota State High School League athletic tournaments.

The mission of Marshall School is to educate students to become global citizens who demonstrate strong academic habits, respect, compassion, integrity, self-discipline, and intellectual curiosity.

History

Cathedral Senior High School

Founded in 1904 by the Catholic Diocese of Duluth, Duluth Cathedral was originally a high school for boys. In 1910, the diocese added girls, but it wasn't until 1942 that the school was fully coeducational. In 1963, the school moved to the newly constructed campus on Rice Lake Road, where it remains to this day.

Marshall School
Marshall School is the Twin Ports flagship independent school and has served the Duluth area for more than a century. Founded in 1904 as Cathedral Senior High School, Marshall has adapted with Duluth as the educational needs of the community changed. The foundation of providing the highest-quality, college-preparatory educational experience to students in the area has always remained a part of the school's history.

Now a member of the National Association of Independent Schools (NAIS) and the Independent Schools Association of the Central States (ISACS), Marshall serves students age 4 -12th grade with personalized attention, small class sizes, and advanced academic experiences.

Originally located in downtown Duluth on the corner of 4th Street and 2nd Avenue, the school began as a Catholic high school. In the early 1960s, the school moved to its current location in Duluth on Rice Lake Road. It became an all-faith institution in the early 1970s, which led to a name change to Marshall School in 1987.

Marshall School expanded to include grades 7 and 8 in the early 1990s. Recently, Marshall has added grades 4, 5, and 6 in the past two decades, and in the Fall of 2022 will be opening the Forest School. The Forest School will serve children ages four through fourth grade. Since 2006, Marshall has also had a robust international program with more than 200 students from nearly 44 countries.

Along with always being known as the Hilltoppers, Marshall's unique history has consistently upheld the values of exhibiting strong academic habits, integrity, respect, and compassion.

Campus
The campus is on a  hillside overlooking Lake Superior and downtown Duluth and includes academic and technology centers, athletic fields, cross-country ski trails, tennis courts, a hockey rink, and fine arts and performance areas. In 2016, on-campus housing was added for international students.

Academics

Admissions
Each component of the admissions process is designed to assess the fit between school and student. The student essay, academic work, campus visit, and personal interviews as well as the placement test all provide important information for the family and Marshall School in helping to determine the enrollment decision.
 
The Admissions office does not select students solely on the basis of academic strength. A willingness to prioritize academics, the desire to be a "person of character", and a desire to be a part of the Marshall School community are essential qualities for a positive admission decision.

On average, 60% of students at Marshall receive need-based financial aid.

Upper school
The Marshall Upper School prepares students to be leaders in their communities, facilitators of their life-long learning experiences, and contributors to a more just and empathetic world. Educators create learning environments that inspire, broaden perspective, form connections, develop agency, and build community. A learning model that incorporates high academic standards and student-centered learning develops students’ abilities to solve problems, communicate effectively, think curiously and creatively, become engaged and ethical citizens, and develop agency and resiliency. The upper school experience is intentionally built to engage students and meet them where they are at, both academically and social-emotionally. The upper school community strives for students to have authentic and meaningful connections with other students, with their teachers, and with other community members. Students learn to think critically, work collaboratively, act courageously, and live compassionately. Through a variety of learning experiences, students gain a deeper understanding and appreciation for the diverse perspectives and experiences of those around them.

The average class size is 18. Fine arts opportunities include concert choir, chamber choir, concert band, jazz band, concert orchestra strings ensemble, and drama program.

Nearly 70% of seniors sit for AP exams across 23 subjects, with nearly 75% scoring a 3 or higher. The 2015 ACT average score was 27.

Upon graduation from Marshall, 98% of students attend four-year colleges.

Community Service Learning Program
Students in grades nine through twelve are required to complete a minimum of ten hours of community service each year, with a total of forty hours required for graduation.

Middle school
Marshall School's middle school serves students in grades 5 through 8. Marshall's middle school lays the foundation for developing and nurturing our core values: strong academic habits, respect, compassion, integrity, self-discipline and intellectual curiosity. Early on, students are encouraged to be confident and independent thinkers with challenging yet attainable goals for each learner. small class sizes invoke active engagement, exploration of unique interests, and individualized support through a vigorous curriculum. Middle School students are able to take a range of diverse classes including music ensembles, daily foreign language courses, and daily physical education.

Forest School at Marshall
The Forest School at Marshall opened in the Fall of 2022 and serves students age 4 through fourth grade. The program is guided by four main principles including engaging in a brain-based curriculum that builds foundations for success, creating lifelong connections to the Earth and each other, learning through curiosity and discovery, and developing holistic learners who demonstrate compassion, resilience and self-worth. 50% of the school day will be spent outside learning on the campus grounds.

Faculty
Marshall School has a student to faculty ratio of 12:1. Of the 44 faculty members, 19 hold advanced degrees and 4 hold doctorates.

Activities
With many different clubs, activities, and academic teams to choose from, Marshall offers each student a unique combination of ways to participate and get involved. In addition, Marshall emphasizes community service and leadership both in and outside of the classroom. Off-campus learning is experienced through Marshall's Fryberger Outdoor Experience program. Daily advisory enriches the lives of middle and upper school students, and school spirit and pride is felt throughout the year

A diverse activities list offers students the opportunity to explore specific interests and hone their passions and skills.

Upper school clubs

Athletics
Marshall School supports 19 athletic teams that compete in the Lake Superior Conference, Section 7A (except Boys Hockey, which competes at Section 7AA), and the Minnesota State High School League. Athletics are a proud part of the Marshall experience. More than 85% of Marshall students participate in at least one sport, often alongside other clubs and activities including cheering on fellow student-athletes at competitions throughout the year. Marshall teams compete at the varsity level in 19 different MSHSL sports. Most sports offer opportunities at junior high and JV levels. On every team, our student-athletes learn the lifelong skills of teamwork, discipline, and sportsmanship.

Upper school athletics

Middle school athletics

Boys' hockey
From  Brendan Flaherty, who graduated from Duluth Cathedral in 1982, coached the team for 22 seasons.  Coach Flaherty was a three-time Section Coach of the Year, won four Conference Championships, eight Section Championships, and was a three-time State Championship finalist. He coached nine Division I players and nineteen Division III players, among them Jack Connolly, UMD, Hobey Baker recipient 2012. The Hilltoppers have appeared in seven state tournaments, and most recently finished fifth in the state tournament (2013).

In December 2014, Marshall School announced the team would be moving to Class AA beginning in the 2015–2016 season, the larger of the two classes.

Girl’s hockey
Marshall School's Girls' Hockey team had their inaugural season in 2014–2015, playing with just a junior varsity team. In January 2015, Marshall School announced the team would also have a varsity squad for the following 2015–2016 season.

Dance—Jazz division
With six Class A Jazz state championship titles, Marshall School Dance Team is the most winning team since jazz was added to the MSHSL in 1997. The dance team experienced a five-year win streak from 2006 to 2011 before winning again in 2015.

MSHSL State tournament appearances

Notable alumni 
Maria Bamford - comedian
Jack Connolly - member of University of Minnesota Duluth's 2010-2011 Division 1 men's college ice hockey championship team
Tyler George - Olympic Gold medalist in curling at the 2018 Winter Olympics
Hank Harris - actor
David Krmpotich - Olympic Silver medalist in rowing at the 1988 Summer Olympics
Anna Ringsred - Olympic speed skater

In popular culture 
Marshall School was prominently featured within the Netflix Film Christmas Break-In, starring Cameron Seely and Danny Glover. The school's signage and campus was used as backdrops without major alteration, and some students received roles as extras.

References

External links
 

High schools in Duluth, Minnesota
Educational institutions established in 1904
Private middle schools in Minnesota
Private elementary schools in Minnesota
1904 establishments in Minnesota